Amlatara is a village in Bankura I Sub District in Bankura district, West Bengal, India.

Demographics
According to '2011 census of India', the village has a population of 863; 
Males=457 
Females= 406 .

References

Villages in Bankura district